Benjamin "Benji" Nathanial Ungar (born January 19, 1986) is a US Men's Épée fencer.  He was the NCAA Men's Épée Champion in 2006, and was a member of the USA Men's Épée team that won the silver medal at the 2010 World Fencing Championships.

Early life
Ungar is a native New Yorker, and has lived in The Bronx in New York.  He was a child actor, with film credits in The Substance of Fire and Billy Budd. His brother, Jonathan Ungar, also fenced at Harvard ('03).

Ungar was the valedictorian of his class at Bronx High School of Science. In high school, Ungar was a member of the National Honors Society and was a National Merit Scholarship Finalist. While a student at school, he wrote a historical paper on William Hogarth's Southwark Fair, which was published on the Internet and is still available in an updated version.

Fencing career
Ungar has fenced with the New York Athletic Club.  He was a member of US National Men's Epee Team at Cadet and Junior World Championships in 2002, 2003, and 2006. He was a bronze medalist at the World Fencing Junior Championships. Ungar was the first American to win a Junior Épée World Cup, winning the Junior Men's Épée World Cup in 2006. He was also the Junior Men's Épée World Championships Bronze Medalist in 2006.

Fencing for Harvard University as a sophomore, Ungar was the NCAA Men's Épée Champion in 2006. His win was listed as one of Harvard's 25 greatest athletic accomplishments. Ungar became the third Harvard men's fencer to win an NCAA individual title, and was Academic All-Ivy League.  He was Harvard University's Male Athlete of the Year 2006. Ungar was also a two time All-American and two-time All-Ivy League honoree.

Ungar was a Senior Men's Épée World Championships Silver Medalist in 2010.

Medical career

Ungar is a 2017 graduate of the Icahn School of Medicine at Mount Sinai and graduate from dermatology residency within the same institution in 2021. Now he serves as the director for Alopecia Center of Excellence and the director of Rosacea and Seborrheic Dermatitis Clinics at the ISMMS. In 2011, he accepted an award for Best Basic Science Paper by the International Society for the Advancement of Spine Surgery.

See also
 List of select Jewish fencers

References

1986 births
Living people
American male épée fencers
Jewish male épée fencers
Harvard University alumni
The Bronx High School of Science alumni
Jewish American sportspeople
Pan American Games bronze medalists for the United States
Pan American Games medalists in fencing
Sportspeople from New York City
Fencers at the 2007 Pan American Games
Medalists at the 2007 Pan American Games
21st-century American Jews